Hofenacker is a small hamlet, which belongs to the Swiss municipality of Ramsen, in the eastern part of the canton of Schaffhausen.

Geography/Location 
As of December 31, 2012, Hofenacker had 22 inhabitants. Its distance to the centre of the municipality is about 1.7 miles, while it is only 160 yards from the nearest Swiss-German border marker and only 0.6 miles from Spiesshof, a former farmhouse and restaurant exactly on the border and next to the German road between Singen and Gottmadingen.

Hofenacker's importance in connection with the 'Singen Route' 
Between April 1941 and October 1943, at least 19 escaped Allied POW officers and soldiers (Dutch, British, Canadian), most of them coming from Colditz, reached Ramsen, Switzerland, after having crossed the border west of Spiesshof. Hofenacker was an important landmark for them as they knew that they had to keep west of it near a forest, in order not to stray back into a salient of German territory east of it.
Airey Neave and Pat Reid were among these escapees.

History 
In 1293 Hofenacker appears in a document as 'Offenacker'. Until 1800, there was a brickyard. Clay for fabrication of the bricks was available in the vicinity. There was a vineyard in medieval times which disappeared over the centuries. There is a new vineyard, however, which produces the only Ramsen Wine. The types of grape are Pinot noir and Müller-Thurgau.

Further reading 
 Gemeinde Ramsen (editor): Ramsen. Heimatbuch. Herausgegeben zur 1150-Jahr-Feier der Gemeinde Ramsen. Ramsen 1996. (in German)
 Reiner Ruft, The Singen Route. The Stories of Nineteen Allied POW Soldiers and Their Escape to Ramsen, Switzerland, Between 1941 and 1943, Munich 2019, https://www.grin.com/document/456807

External links 
 Official homepage of the municipality of Ramsen - in German
 Dorfgemeinschaft Spiesshof - in German
 Swisstopo - toppgraphical time travel from 1850 to today

References 

Geography of Switzerland